Carole Skinner (born 8 May 1944) is an Australian actress, particularly known for her performances in theatre and television. She is perhaps best known for her role as Nola McKenzie in the soap opera, Prisoner, in Sons and Daughters, as Doris Hudson, and in the miniseries, The Harp in the South, and its sequel, Poor Man's Orange, as Delie Stock.

Career
Skinner began her acting career in 1966, and rose to prominence as an established theatre performer. She is very well known for her roles in Ruth Park's mini-serials The Harp in the South and Poor Man's Orange. Her performance as Olive in Summer of the Seventeenth Doll for the Melbourne Theatre Company in 1977 was also met with high regard.

She became well known for her screen roles, particularly in television, making her debut in 1971, when she made a guest appearance in the Australian series, Dynasty, before going on to play a regular in Lane End (a spin-off series to the serial, Bellbird), and further guest roles in shows, such as, Certain Women, The Evil Touch, Ryan, Behind the Legend, and The Young Doctors.

Skinner became notable for her performance as Nola McKenzie in the Network 10 soap opera, Prisoner (known outside of Australia as Prisoner: Cell Block H), during its fifth season in 1983. The role lasted 6 months, and she later admitted that it was her choice to leave the series after producers offered to extend her contract to continue playing Nola. The character was killed-off in one of the series most iconic scenes, when she was shot in the forehead with a zip gun. This was followed by guest roles in soap operas and drama series', including Sons and Daughters, as Doris Hudson, a house-keeper obsessed with her boss, in which she attempted to smother toddler Robert Palmer in the series' 1985 season cliffhanger episode, as Laura Dennison in Neighbours in 1986, and appearances in The Flying Doctors and A Country Practice. She is also known for her role as Delie Stock in the miniseries, The Harp in the South, based on the novel by Ruth Park, and the sequel miniseries, Poor Man's Orange, also based on Park's second novel of the same name.

She continued to appear in high-profile drama series', including, two different roles in the Seven Network soap opera, Home and Away, as Mary O'Brien during the show's eighth season in 1995, and as Annie Matthews in the twelfth season in 1999, E Street, Minder (when episodes were filmed in Australia), Murder Call, All Saints, and McLeod's Daughters.

Skinner is also a credited film actress, having appeared in several minor roles, including, her feature debut in the sex comedy, Alvin Purple, which spawned two sequels, and a short-lived television series. She continued with roles during the 1970s, in Eliza Frazer, co-starring with Susannah York and John Waters, and the critically acclaimed, My Brilliant Career, with Judy Davis and Sam Neill, before going on to appear in films, such as, Heatwave, Monkey Grip, Goodbye Paradise, The Umbrella Woman, Howling III, the second sequel to the classic 1981 film, and the 2001 blockbuster, Moulin Rouge!, with Nicole Kidman.

Filmography

References

External links

1944 births
Australian film actresses
Australian stage actresses
Living people
Australian soap opera actresses